Indarbela dea is a moth in the family Cossidae first described by Charles Swinhoe in 1890. It is found in Myanmar.

References

Metarbelinae
Moths described in 1890